Patrick Chilton Pearson VRD (1930 – 19 August 2022) was a British philatelist who signed the Roll of Distinguished Philatelists in 1974. He was Vice President of the Federacion Internationale de Philatelie.

Pearson was educated at Westminster School and Cambridge University where he graduated in law.

As a philatelist he specialised in the stamps of Hong Kong, Western Australia, Ceylon and Iraq. He was awarded the Royal Philatelic Society Medal in 1978 and the Mérite Philatélique Européen in 2004. He was elected President of the Royal Philatelic Society London from 1988 to 1990 and Vice-President of the Association International des Experts en Philatélie in 1999.

Publications
Advanced Philatelic Research. Arthur Barker Limited, 1971.

References

1930 births
Living people
People educated at Westminster School, London
Alumni of the University of Cambridge
British philatelists
Signatories to the Roll of Distinguished Philatelists
Presidents of the Royal Philatelic Society London